Kenneth Leonard Wainstein (born 1962) is an American lawyer.
He served as the first Assistant Attorney General for National Security, and later as the Homeland Security Advisor to United States President George W. Bush. In 2022 under the Biden Administration, he was appointed Under Secretary of Homeland Security for Intelligence and Analysis.

Education
Wainstein is a graduate of the University of Virginia and earned his J.D. degree from the University of California, Berkeley School of Law.

Career
Wainstein worked for the Federal Bureau of Investigation, as General Counsel and as Chief of Staff to the FBI Director. He was United States Attorney for the District of Columbia.

On September 26, 2006, he was sworn in as the Department of Justice's Assistant Attorney General responsible for National Security.

Wainstein was appointed Homeland Security Advisor by President George W. Bush on March 30, 2008. He was also Assistant to the President for Homeland Security and Counterterrorism and chaired the Homeland Security Council. He was appointed as the "National Continuity Coordinator" under the auspices of National Security Presidential Directive 51.

Wainstein also serves as a member of the Blue Ribbon Study Panel on Biodefense, a group that encourages and advocates changes to government policy to strengthen national biodefense.

In 2020, Wainstein, along with over 130 other former Republican national security officials, signed a statement that asserted that President Trump was unfit to serve another term, and "To that end, we are firmly convinced that it is in the best interest of our nation that Vice President Joe Biden be elected as the next President of the United States, and we will vote for him."

In October 2020, Wainstein signed a letter, along with 19 other Republican-appointed former U.S. Attorneys, calling President Donald Trump "a threat to the rule of law in our country" and endorsing Joe Biden.

On November 5, 2021, President Joseph Biden nominated Wainstein for the position of Under Secretary of Homeland Security for Intelligence and Analysis. The United States Senate Select Committee on Intelligence held its open hearing on his nomination on January 12, 2022. The United States Senate Committee on Homeland Security and Governmental Affairs held its hearing on his nomination on February 3, 2022. The full Senate voted to confirm Wainstein with 63 votes "Yea" on June 7, 2022. He was sworn in on June 13, 2022.

References

External links

 

|-

|-

1962 births
Living people
United States Assistant Attorneys General
United States Attorneys for the District of Columbia
George W. Bush administration personnel
Biden administration personnel
University of Virginia alumni
UC Berkeley School of Law alumni